Lou Nelle Sutton (December 20, 1905 – July 1, 1994) was a businesswoman and former state representative from San Antonio, Texas.

Born Lou Nelle Callahan, she married Garlington "G. J." Sutton in 1958. Together they would raise his daughter Jeffrey Dean Sutton.

With the encouragement of her husband's best friend Claude Black, Sutton ran and succeeded her late husband in the Texas House of Representatives She represented her district from 1976-1987.

Sutton owned and operated Sutton and Sutton Mortuary and Gates of Heaven Memorial Gardens in San Antonio until her death in July 1994. She is interred next to her husband in that cemetery.

References

External links
Interview with Lou Nelle Sutton, June 21, 1990, University of Texas at San Antonio: Institute of Texan Cultures: Oral History Collections, UA 15.01, University of Texas at San Antonio Libraries Special Collections.

1905 births
1994 deaths
People from San Antonio
Members of the Texas House of Representatives
African-American state legislators in Texas
Women state legislators in Texas
20th-century American politicians
20th-century American women politicians
20th-century African-American women
20th-century African-American politicians